The China Economic Review is a leading peer-reviewed academic journal of Chinese economics, covering quantitative, analytical, and performance and policy analysis on China's economy, its relations with the rest of the world, and other comparative studies. It is an official publication of the Chinese Economists Society. The founding editor-in-chief was Weijian Shan, and the current editor is Belton M. Fleisher.

References

External links 
 

Publications established in 1989
Economics journals
English-language journals
Elsevier academic journals
Quarterly journals